Žepovci is a village in the Municipality of Apače in northeastern Slovenia.

The village chapel with a belfry over its entrance is dedicated to the Virgin Mary. It was built in the second half of the 19th century, with the belfry rebuilt at a later date.

References

External links 
Žepovci on Geopedia

Populated places in the Municipality of Apače